David Staples (born: 27 August 1953) is a sailor from Barbados. who represented his country at the 1992 Summer Olympics in Barcelona, Spain as crew member in the Soling. With helmsman Richard Hoad and fellow crew member Jason Teller they took the 22nd place.

References

Living people
1953 births
Sailors at the 1992 Summer Olympics – Soling
Olympic sailors of Barbados
Barbadian male sailors (sport)